The Widener Pride football team represents Widener University in college football. The football team has had recent success winning the MAC championship in 2012 and an "Elite 8" appearance in the Division III Playoffs, the ECAC Southwest Bowl in 2011, and the ECAC South Atlantic Bowl in 2005.  Its greatest success has been winning the NCAA Division III National Championship in 1977 and 1981 under long-time coach Bill Manlove and reaching the semi-finals in 1979, 1980, and 2000. Widener also reached the quarterfinals of the tournament in 2012 before losing to eventual NCAA D-III National Champion, Mount Union, by a lopsided 72–17 score.  Additionally, Widener football has won 17 MAC championships, the most of any team in the conference.  Billy "White Shoes" Johnson played for Widener in the early 70s.  He went on to be an all-pro National Football League player and was selected to the NFL 75th Anniversary All-Time Team as well as the College Football Hall of Fame.

References

External links
 

 
American football teams established in 1879
1879 establishments in Pennsylvania